Chartoloma is a genus of flowering plants belonging to the family Brassicaceae.

Its native range is Central Asia.

Species:
 Chartoloma platycarpum (Bunge) Bunge

References

Brassicaceae
Brassicaceae genera
Taxa named by Alexander von Bunge